Gonzalo Morales may refer to:

Gonzalo Morales (actor), Argentine actor
Gonzalo Morales Sáurez (1945–2017), Costa Rican painter